Julia Fordham is the debut album by English singer-songwriter Julia Fordham, released in 1988. It includes the single "Happy Ever After", which reached number 27 in the UK Singles Chart, along with three further singles: "The Comfort of Strangers" (UK No. 89), "Woman of the 80's" (UK No. 83) and "Where Does the Time Go?" (UK No. 41).

Track listing
All tracks written by Julia Fordham.

Personnel
Adapted from AllMusic.

Afrodiziak – vocals
Carlos Alomar – guitar
Brian Aris – photography
Howie B – assistant engineer
Robin Clark – vocals
Michael Cozzi – guitar
Claudia Fontaine – vocals
Antonio Forcione – guitar
Julia Fordham – vocals
Angie Giles – vocals
Omar Hakim – drums
Luís Jardim – percussion
Bashiri Johnson – percussion
Robbie Kondor - keyboards
Noel Langley – flugelhorn, flute, trumpet
Tony Levin – bass
Bob Ludwig – mastering
Joe Mardin – conductor
Grant Mitchell – arranger, brass arrangement, keyboard programming, keyboards, producer, programming, string arrangements, vocals
Peter Mountain – photography
The New West Horns – ensemble, horn
John O'Kane – bass, vocals
Naomi Osbourne – vocals
Hugh Padgham – engineer, mixing
Bill Padley – engineer, producer, programming, vocals
David Palmer – bass, cello, drums, stick
Dave Sinclair – bass, cello, stick
Ashley Slater – trombone
Andy Snitzer – saxophone
Caron Wheeler – vocals
Taj Wyzgowski – guitar

Charts and certifications

Weekly charts

Certifications

References

External links
Julia Fordham at Discogs

1988 debut albums
Virgin Records albums
Julia Fordham albums